The Fall Guy is an upcoming American action thriller film directed by David Leitch, written by Drew Pearce, and starring Ryan Gosling and Emily Blunt. It is an adaptation of the 1980s TV series of the same name created by Glen A. Larson, which starred Lee Majors.

The Fall Guy is set to be released on March 1, 2024, by Universal Pictures.

Premise
A battered and past-his-prime stuntman finds himself working on a movie set with the star for whom he doubled long ago and who replaced him. The star then goes missing.

Cast
 Ryan Gosling as a stuntman
 Emily Blunt as a prosthetic makeup artist with a romantic connection to the stuntman
 Aaron Taylor-Johnson as a movie star who goes missing
 Stephanie Hsu as the movie star's personal assistant
 Winston Duke as the stuntman's best friend 
 Hannah Waddingham as a film producer
 Teresa Palmer
 Ben Knight

Production

Development
In July 2010, the Los Angeles Times reported that a film based on the 1980s series The Fall Guy was in development. DreamWorks had teamed up with producers Walter F. Parkes and Laurie MacDonald on the project, and Martin Campbell was in talks to direct the film. DreamWorks, through Disney's Touchstone Pictures distribution label, was to release the film in North America, Latin America, Russia, Australia, and Asia, while Mister Smith Entertainment would have handled sales in the remaining territories. In September 2013, Dwayne Johnson was in negotiations to play the title role and McG was in talks to direct.

In September 2020, Ryan Gosling, director David Leitch, and writer Drew Pearce were said to be working on an "unnamed stuntman film" that had been picked up by Universal Pictures. In May 2022, it was confirmed this project was a remake of The Fall Guy. The film is produced by Universal Pictures with Leitch's 87North and Entertainment 360, with Leitch and Kelly McCormick producing alongside Gosling and Guymon Casady. Pearce is also an executive producer, as are Geoff Shaevitz and original series creator Glen A. Larson. 

Variety reported that the Australian Government and the New South Wales state authorities added funds to the production up to A$30 million and A$14.5 million respectively, with Paul Fletcher, Australia's Federal Minister for Communications, Urban Infrastructure, Cities and the Arts, estimating a boom to the local economy, over 1,000 Australian cast and crew, and more than 3,015 Australian film extras.

Casting 
In September 2022, Emily Blunt was added to the cast and Gosling and his family arrived in Australia to begin filming. In October 2022, it was revealed that Aaron Taylor-Johnson and Stephanie Hsu would join the cast. In November 2022, Winston Duke, Hannah Waddingham and Teresa Palmer joined the cast.

Filming
Principal photography began in October 2022 in Sydney, Australia, at the Disney Studios Australia in Moore Park, Sydney. On October 20, 2022, images of the production filming night shoots in the Goulburn Street parking lot in Sydney appeared in the media with Gosling sporting long hair and a beard. On 22 January 2023, the Sydney Harbour Bridge was closed for several daytime hours for filming of scenes involving Ryan Gosling. Principal photography was completed on March 2, 2023.

Release
The Fall Guy is set to be released on March 1, 2024.

References

External links
 

Upcoming films
2024 films
2024 action thriller films
2020s American films
2020s English-language films
American action thriller films
Films about actors
Films about missing people
Films about stunt performers
Films based on television series
Films directed by David Leitch
Films shot in Sydney
Films with screenplays by Drew Pearce
Universal Pictures films
Upcoming English-language films